The Common Ground is an album by American jazz flautist Herbie Mann recorded in 1960 for the Atlantic label.

Reception

Allmusic awarded the album 3½ stars stating "Most of the instrumental dexterity on the album is supplied by Mann's flute, which perfectly matches the mood of material. For the faithful, The Common Ground delivers an enjoyable (if short) set at the beginning of Mann's long, successful career as a popular artist on Atlantic Records".

Track listing
All compositions by Herbie Mann except as indicated
 "Baghdad/Asia Minor" (Herbie Mann/Roger Mozian) - 5:09
 "Walkin'" (Richard Carpenter) - 5:23
 "Sawa Sawa De'" - 3:05
 "St. Thomas" (Sonny Rollins) - 3:24
 "High Life"  - 2:11
 "Uhuru" (Herbie Mann, Michael Olatunji) - 4:55
 "A Night in Tunisia" (Dizzy Gillespie, Frank Paparelli) - 6:00
 "The Common Ground" - 3:48

Personnel 
Herbie Mann - flute
Doc Cheatham, Leo Ball, Jerome Kail, Ziggy Schatz - trumpet 
Johnny Rae - vibraphone
Knobby Totah - bass
Rudy Collins - drums
Ray Barretto - congas
Ray Mantilla - bongos
Michael Olatunji - percussion, vocals
Maya Angela, Dolores Parker - vocals

References 

1960 albums
Herbie Mann albums
Albums produced by Nesuhi Ertegun
Atlantic Records albums